Last Stop Suburbia is Allister's third release on Drive-Thru Records and second studio album, released on October 8, 2002.

Recording
In November 2001, Allister played a few US shows with Reel Big Fish. The band planned to enter the studio in December. The band was in the studio from February 18, 2002 and planned to finish on March 18. Instead, the band finished recording on May 9. Sessions were held at Standard Electrical Recorders in Venice Beach, California, with producer and engineer Chris Fudurich; Ryan Baker did additional editing. Steve Evetts mixed the recordings at Trax East in South River, New Jersey, before the album was mastered by Stephen Marcussen at Marcussen Mastering in Hollywood, California.

Release and reception

On June 9, 2002, guitarist John Hamada left the band. Between late June and mid-August, the group went on the 2002 edition of Warped Tour. On August 31, "Overrated" was made available as a free download through the band's MP3.com profile. Originally planned for a June release, before being pushed back to August, then early September due mixing delays. Last Stop Suburbia was made available for streaming on September 25, before it was eventually released on October 8, 2002 through Drive-Thru. In early 2003, the band supported American Hi-Fi on their tour, before embarking on a trek across the US East Coast with Don't Look Down and Fall Out Boy. Between late August and October 2003, the group performed on the Drive-Thru Records 2003 Invasion Tour. In January 2004, the band went on a tour of the UK, with Home Grown, the Early November, and Hidden in Plain View. In May 2004, the band toured the US with Split Habit, Punchline, and Hidden in Plain View.

Last Stop Suburbia charted at number 9 on the Billboard Heatseekers Albums chart. The album would go on to sell 80,000 copies. Reviewing the album for AllMusic, Kurt Morris said the album was full of "upbeat, poppy songs" matched with "nice melodies and songs about girls and rock & roll." Morris also said it was "typical Drive-Thru Records pop-punk" fodder. BuzzFeed included the album at number 30 on their "36 Pop Punk Albums You Need To Hear Before You F——ing Die" list. Cleveland.com ranked "Somewhere on Fullerton" at number 74 on their list of the top 100 pop-punk songs.

Track listing
Writing credits per booklet.

 "Scratch" – 3:11 (Hamada)
 "Radio Player" – 3:25 (Rogner)
 "Flypaper" – 2:12 (Murphy)
 "Overrated" – 2:25 (Rogner) 
 "Better Late Than Forever" – 2:40 (Hamada)
 "The One That Got Away" – 1:41 (Murphy)
 "Racecars" – 2:39 (Rogner)
 "Matchsticks" – 2:04 (Rogner)
 "Camouflage" – 2:14 (Murphy)
 "Don't Think Twice" – 2:52 (Rogner)
 "Somewhere on Fullerton" – 2:39 (Rogner)
 "Westbound" – 2:14 (Murphy)
 "Know It All" – 1:45 (Rogner)
 "Stuck" – 1:55 (Hamada)
 "Waiting for You" – 2:29 (Rogner)
 "None of My Friends Are Punks" – 2:34 (Rogner)

Chart positions

Personnel
Personnel per booklet.

Allister 
 Tim Rogner – vocals, guitar
 Scott Murphy – vocals, bass
 Chris Rogner – vocals, guitar
 David Rossi – drums

Additional musicians
 John Hamada – vocals, guitar
 Ariel Rechtshaid – additional guitar (track 15)

Production
 Chris Fudurich – producer, engineer
 Steve Evetts – mixing
 Ryan Baker – additional editing
 Stephen Marcussen – mastering

Design
 Tim Stedman – art direction, design, interior photos
 Matt Mahurin – front and back cover illustrations
 Justin Stephens – band photo
 JP Robinson – design assistance

References

Allister albums
2002 albums
Drive-Thru Records albums